Haemodorum discolor is a shrub native to southwestern Australia.

References

discolor
Angiosperms of Western Australia
Plants described in 1987
Taxa named by Terry Desmond Macfarlane